High Seat is a fell in the dale of Mallerstang, Cumbria. It is in the north-western part of the Dales, overlooking the deep trench of Mallerstang, and is usually climbed from this side.

To the south-east is Hugh Seat (whose summit is marked by Lady Anne's Pillar, commemorating Sir Hugh de Morville). On the opposite (western) side of Mallerstang is the more striking (but 1 metre lower) Wild Boar Fell.

It is not a Marilyn, having a relative height of 112 m, and therefore may be regarded as a subsidiary top of Great Shunner Fell, to the east. It is, however, a HuMP.

Oddly enough, it is the highest point on the main England east-to-west watershed in the Dales, the three higher fells being some distance from the watershed.
 
Three main rivers have their origins in the peat bogs here: the River Eden, the River Swale, and the River Ure.

See also
 High Seat, Lake District
 Wild Boar Fell

References

External links
"A walk through Mallerstang"
High Seat on My Yorkshire Dales
Peaks of the Yorkshire Dales
Hewitts of England
Nuttalls
Mallerstang